Gábor Totola (born 10 December 1973) is a Hungarian fencer, who won a silver medal in the team Épée competition at the 1992 Summer Olympics in Barcelona together with Krisztián Kulcsár, Ferenc Hegedüs, Ernõ Kolczonay and Iván Kovács.

References

External links
Gábor Totola at Sport Reference

1973 births
Living people
Hungarian male épée fencers
Fencers at the 1992 Summer Olympics
Olympic fencers of Hungary
Olympic silver medalists for Hungary
Olympic medalists in fencing
Martial artists from Budapest
Medalists at the 1992 Summer Olympics
20th-century Hungarian people
21st-century Hungarian people